Operation Dragon Fire was an operation conducted by the South Korean 2nd Marine Brigade on the Batangan Peninsula, Quảng Ngãi Province, lasting from 5 September to 31 October 1967. The event and much of Korean Marines activities in the region was described as part of a wide-scale depopulation of the region.

Prelude
The Batangan Peninsula was a well-known Viet Cong (VC) stronghold and had been the scene of several previous Allied operations, including Operation Piranha in 1965. In 1966 the peninsula became part of the Tactical Area of Responsibility of the 2nd Marine Brigade. In response to significant losses of Korean forces to regular units of VC during ambushes, the Koreans begun attacking civilian areas in what was described as a "near-complete destruction of civilian life in the Quảng Ngãi region." In early September 1967 intelligence indicated that the VC 48th Battalion had moved into the peninsula for recruitment and resupply.

Operation
On 5 September, 2nd Marine Brigade commander, BG Kim Yun-sang deployed 3 Battalions to sweep the peninsula, while the fourth constructed a base at the south of the peninsula. By the end of September the Marines claimed to have killed 404 VC and captured 14 and 28 weapons (described as a "remarkably high ratio of kills to weapons captured"), while losing 39 killed.

During October the Marines claimed to have killed 137 VC and captured 17 weapons for the loss of seven killed.

Aftermath
Operation Dragon Fire officially concluded on 31 October, with the ROK claiming that VC losses were 541 killed and 59 weapons recovered, ROK losses were 46 killed. An unknown number may have been civilians. The area reverted to VC control and many civilians would join the VC.

References

Conflicts in 1967
1967 in Vietnam
Battles involving Vietnam
Battles and operations of the Vietnam War in 1967
History of Quảng Ngãi province